The 76th Texas Legislature met from January 12, 1999 to May 31, 1999. All members present during this session were elected in the 1998 general elections.

Sessions

Regular Session: January 12, 1999 - May 31, 1999

Party summary

Senate

House

Officers

Senate
 Lieutenant Governor: Rick Perry, Republican
 President Pro Tempore: Teel Bivins, Republican

House
 Speaker of the House: Pete Laney, Democrat

Members

Senate

House

External links

76th Texas Legislature
1999 in Texas
1999 U.S. legislative sessions